The Wushishi tramway was a narrow gauge, tramway linking Wushishi to Zungeru. Construction began in May 1901 and was finished by December in the same year. A year later it was decided to extend the line 10 mile south along the river as Bari-Juko was judged to provide better facilities than Wushishi. The line was not to last long as by 1910 the Baro-Kano Railway, which ran through Zungero, had been completed. The Wushishi Tramway was no longer so useful and the track was lifted and used to build the Bauchi Light Railway.

The tramway's first locomotive Engine No. 1 a Hunslet 0-6-0T (wks 762) is now preserved under a canopy at Minna Station.

References

2 ft 6 in gauge railways in Nigeria
Railway lines opened in 1901
Railway lines closed in 1910